Zinenskaya is a rural locality (a village) in Vozhegodskoye Urban Settlement, Vozhegodsky District, Vologda Oblast, Russia. The population was 2 as of 2002.

Geography 
Zinenskaya is located 12 km southwest of Vozhega (the district's administrative centre) by road. Olshukovskaya is the nearest rural locality.

References 

Rural localities in Vozhegodsky District